Romania competed at the 2022 World Games held in Birmingham, United States from 7 to 17 July 2022. Athletes representing Romania won one silver medal and two bronze medals. The country finished in 57th place in the medal table.

Medalists

Competitors
The following is the list of number of competitors in the Games:

Aerobic gymnastics

Romania won three medals in aerobic gymnastics.

Dancesport

Romania competed in dancesport.

Duathlon

Romania competed in duathlon.

Ju-jitsu

Romania competed in ju-jitsu.

Kickboxing

Romania competed in kickboxing.

Rhythmic gymnastics

Romania competed in rhythmic gymnastics.

References

Nations at the 2022 World Games
2022
World Games